A webmaster is a person responsible for maintaining one or more websites. The title may refer to web architects, web developers, site authors, website administrators, website owners, website coordinators, or website publishers.

The duties of a webmaster could include:
 Creating, editing, and publishing content on the website, either independently or with other content creators
 Content placement
 Managing a website's appearance, user access rights, and navigation
 Ensuring that the web servers, hardware and software are operating correctly
 A/B testing
 Analysing traffic through the site
 Ensuring the website is up to date and functioning correctly, e.g. installing updates, fixing bugs and errors, and optimizing performance
 Optimizing the website's content and structure to improve its ranking in search engines (SEO), e.g. keyword research, link building, and optimizing meta tags and titles
 Keeping the site secure, e.g. installing security software, monitoring for threats, and implementing practices for data protection
 Analytics, e.g. monitoring the website's traffic and performance to make informed decisions about its content
 Customer support, e.g. troubleshooting any issues that users may be experiencing.

Due to the  requirement for establishing a "postmaster" email address for the single point of contact for the email administrator of a domain, the "webmaster" address and title were unofficially adopted by analogy for the website administrator. , which turned this common practice into a standard.

Webmasters may be generalists with HTML expertise who manage most or all aspects of web operations. Depending on the nature of the websites they manage, webmasters may be required to know scripting languages such as ColdFusion, JavaScript, JSP, .NET, Perl, PHP, Python and Ruby. They may also need to know how to configure web servers such as Apache and be a server administrator. Most server roles, however, would be overseen by an IT Administrator.

See also
 Chief web officer
 Database administrator
 Postmaster (computing)
 Web design

References

Computer occupations
Website management